= List of trade organisations =

This is a list of international trade organizations, the largest being the World Trade Organization.

== List of trade organizations ==
Name	Symbol	No. of members	Headquarters
World Trade Organization		164	Geneva, Switzerland
European Union		27	Brussels, Belgium
Organisation of Petroleum exporting countries (OPEC)		14	Vienna, Austria
South Asian Association for Regional Co-operation (SAARC)		8	Kathmandu, Nepal
Association of South East Asian Nations (ASEAN)		10	Jakarta, Indonesia
Asia-Pacific Economic Cooperation (APEC)		21	Singapore
BRICS (Brazil, Russia, India, China and South Africa)		5	Shanghai, China
